The Englon SC5-RV is a subcompact hatchback produced by Chinese auto manufacturer Englon. It debuted as a concept at the 2010 Beijing Auto Show. Price ranges from 52.300 yuan to 56.300 yuan.

Overview

Safety
In 2013 the Englon SC5-RV received 5 stars during the crash test commissioned and tested by the C-NCAP in Tianjin, China.

Facelift
A facelift was conducted in 2013 with revised front bumper, rear bumper, and light units.

Englon SX5
A subcompact SUV based on the Englon SC5-RV hatchback call the Englon SX5 was launched shortly after. Which is essentially the Geely Englon SC5-RV slightly lifted with different bumpers and plastic cladding.

Geely GLEagle GC5
The Geely GLEagle GC5 debuted at the Beijing Auto Show in April as a sedan variant of the Englon SC5-RV, and was listed in early 2011.

Kandi K17A EV
The K17A debuted on August 5, 2016, as the first product of Kandi Technologies. From the exterior, the Kandi K17A EV was essentially a rebadged Englon SC5-RV, and the vehicle was originally built for the Kandi EV CarShare, a carsharing program in the city of Hangzhou. The system operates only with Kandi EV all-electric cars, which are available to customers in automated garages that run like vending machines. The leasing option, called "Long Lease,"  is available from 1- to 3-year contracts.

References

External links

SC5-RV
Subcompact cars
C-NCAP superminis
Front-wheel-drive vehicles
Hatchbacks
Cars introduced in 2010
2010s cars